Booky Makes Her Mark is a made-for-TV movie that is based on the books by Bernice Thurman Hunter, starring Tatiana Maslany. The family film also features Megan Follows, Roberta Maxwell and Lally Cadeau. Filmed in Hamilton, Ontario, Canada and set in Toronto, it features a young and diverse cast of Canadian actors and actresses.

Plot
Beatrice "Booky" Thomson is a spunky 15-year-old who dreams of becoming a great writer despite the odds. Life in Toronto during the 1930s are hard ones for Booky's family. Parents Thomas and Francy are barely able to eke out a living for themselves and their children Willa, Arthur, and Booky. But irrepressible Booky, with her big imagination and even bigger plans, seems able to tackle anything.

When her new school teacher, Mr. Jackson, inspires her to become a writer, Booky pursues her career with gusto - until she lets some well-meaning advice from a great Canadian author shatter her dreams.

Following a short stay at Aunt Aggie's Muskoka farm to quell a bout of bronchitis, Booky returns home to resume the usual joys and trials of growing up. She starts the Deanna Durbin fan club with her best friends Ruthie and Gladys, rebuffs the advances of her brother's trouble-making friend Georgie, celebrates her 16th birthday with disastrous results, and falls for Gloria's ex-boyfriend Lorne. Then one day, she decides to enter the local newspaper's essay writing contest and what happens after that nearly turns Booky's life upside down.

Cast

Accolades
 2006, Directors Guild of Canada nomination for 'DGC Craft Award'
 2006, Directors Guild of Canada nomination for 'DGC Team Award'
 2007, Canadian Society of Cinematographers nomination for 'Best Cinematography in TV Drama'
 2007, Gemini Awards nomination for 'Best Performance by an Actor in a Featured Supporting Role in a Dramatic Program or Mini-Series'
 2007, Gemini Awards nomination for 'Best Performance by an Actress in a Featured Supporting Role in a Dramatic Program or Mini-Series'
 2007, Gemini Awards nomination for 'Best Photography in a Dramatic Program or Series'

References

External links

Canadian television films
2006 television films
2006 films
English-language Canadian films
2000s Canadian films